is a Japanese transgender TV personality and singer.

In October 2009, Haruna won the "Miss International Queen 2009" transgender beauty pageant held in Pattaya, Thailand, becoming the first Japanese contestant to win the title.

Discography

Singles
 "I・U・Yo・Ne" (2008)
  (2009)
 "Crazy Love" (2010) 
  (2012)
 (2016)

Collaborations
 "Momi Momi Fantastic feat. Haruna Ai" - Asia Engineer (2009)

TV commercials
 Fanta Momi Momi Frozen (2009)
Suzuki " Carry "(Website: August 2013 -) (TV: September 2013 -) - Bunta Sugawara, Hokuto and co-star.
Suzuki " EVERY " (February 2015 -) - Takashi Ukaji, Hiroshi Madoka and co-star.

References

External links
 office site
 Yukina official website 
 Ai Haruna Official Twitter
 Official blog 
 Association Miss contest of Japan 

1972 births
Japanese beauty pageant winners
Japanese impressionists (entertainers)
Japanese television personalities
Japanese transgender people
Japanese LGBT singers
Japanese actresses
Living people
People from Osaka
Transgender singers
LGBT media personalities
Transgender women musicians
Japanese media personalities
21st-century Japanese women singers
21st-century Japanese LGBT people
Miss International Queen winners